Sadie Coles HQ is a contemporary art gallery in London,  owned and directed by Sadie Coles. The gallery focuses on presenting the work of established and emerging international artists. It was at the forefront of the Young British Artists movement.

History
Sadie Coles HQ opened in April 1997 and has since operated from a variety of distinctive spaces. Its inaugural exhibition at 35 Heddon Street, by American painter John Currin, was followed by Sarah Lucas’s exhibition ‘The Law’ in lofts on St John Street.

Between 2010 and 2013, Sadie Coles HQ was located at both New Burlington Place – a  space on the site of Nigel Greenwood's gallery during the 1980s and 90s – and on South Audley Street.

In 2013, Sadie Coles HQ moved to its current location, a  first floor gallery on Kingly Street in what was formerly the La Valbonne nightclub. In November 2015, it opened a third location in a glass-fronted  space on Davies Street in Mayfair designed by 6a architects

Since her inaugural exhibition, Coles has followed the same formula for each of her invitations. Taking the graphic identity of the gallery itself – a grey block that represents the gallery space and is found on all her branded material – she uses the same block on the invitations, allowing each artist to choose their own colour. A piece of the artist’s work is then shown on the inside of the card.

In 2014, Sadie Coles was listed as one of 'the most powerful people in the art world' by The Guardian.

Artists
Coles has worked with Sarah Lucas since the founding of Sadie Coles HQ. From February to December 2012, Situation, a temporary space, showed works by Lucas. The extended display will include works both new and historical, mainly by Lucas and occasionally involving other artists.

Artists represented include Carl Andre, Matthew Barney, Alvaro Barrington, Avner Ben-Gal, Frank Benson, John Bock, Don Brown, Spartacus Chetwynd, Steven Claydon, William N. Copley, John Currin, Sam Durant, Angus Fairhurst, Urs Fischer, Jonathan Horowitz, David Korty, Gabriel Kuri, Jim Lambie, Lawrence Lek, Hilary Lloyd, Sarah Lucas, Hellen van Meene, Victoria Morton, JP Munro, Laura Owens, Simon Periton, Raymond Pettibon, Elizabeth Peyton, Richard Prince, Ugo Rondinone, Wilhelm Sasnal, Gregor Schneider, Daniel Sinsel, Andreas Slominski, Christiana Soulou, Helen Marten, Rudolf Stingel, Ryan Sullivan, Martine Syms (since 2017), Nicola Tyson, Paloma Varga Weisz, TJ Wilcox, Jordan Wolfson, Steve Dowson, and Andrea Zittel.

References

Further reading
Sadie Coles and Jonathan Harris, "Sadie Coles HQ: Anatomy of a gallery in the age of globalised contemporary art" in Art, Money, Parties: New Institutions in the Political Economy of Contemporary Art, ed. Jonathan Harris, University of Chicago Press, 2005.

External links
Sadie Coles HQ website
Sadie Coles HQ at Ocula
Sadie Coles HQ at Royist

 

Event venues established in 1997
Contemporary art galleries in London
Buildings and structures in the City of Westminster
Tourist attractions in the City of Westminster
Art galleries established in 1997
1997 establishments in England